Neil Roberts (born May 8, 1945) is a former American basketball coach who coached at both Dixie State and Southern Utah.

Playing career
Roberts played college basketball at BYU from 1964 to 1967. He was named Look Magazine All-American in 1967.

Coaching career
Roberts' coaching career would begin in the high school ranks, notably at Skyline High School, where he won two state championships. He compiled a 172–38 overall record as a high school coach. In 1978, Roberts would accept the head coaching position at then-NJCAA program Dixie State. He remained with the Trailblazers until 1985, making three national tournaments and winning the 1985 NJCAA Division I championship. After a brief hiatus from coaching, Roberts would become the head coach at Southern Utah, helping guide its transition from NCAA Division II to Division I. He served as coach until 1992, ending with a 54–51 record. Roberts resigned as coach during the 1991–92 season after being accused of shoplifting a $30 necktie. He was replaced by Bill Evans.

Head coaching record

NCAA D1

‡ Resigned midseason

References

Living people
1945 births
American men's basketball coaches
Basketball coaches from Utah
Utah Tech Trailblazers men's basketball coaches
Southern Utah Thunderbirds men's basketball coaches
BYU Cougars men's basketball players
People from Cedar City, Utah
Basketball players from Utah